Morne Bois-Pin is the fourth highest mountain in Haiti. The three taller Haitian mountains are Pic la Selle, Pic Macaya, and Morne du Cibao.

References 
 
Footnotes

Mountains of Haiti